John Lodge may refer to:

 John Lodge (musician) (born 1945), bass guitarist for the Moody Blues
 John Lodge (archivist) (died 1774), English historian who wrote The Peerage of Ireland
 John C. Lodge (1862–1950), Mayor of Detroit
 John Davis Lodge (1903–1985), American film actor, politician, and diplomat
 John Lodge (librarian) (1792–1850), librarian of the University of Cambridge

See also 
 St. John's Lodge (disambiguation)
 John C. Lodge Freeway, route M-10 in southeast Michigan
 Governor John Davis Lodge Turnpike, usually known as the (former) Connecticut Turnpike